Willi Pape (Willy Pape, Voo-Doo, Selma Bruegge; 1893–1967) was a celebrated German cabaret owner and performer in Weimar Berlin who was contemporarily referred to as a "transvestite."

Pape was a patient of German sexologist Magnus Hirschfeld, who wrote the following to accompany pictures of Pape in his 1912 book The Transvestites:The young transvestite Willy Pape, whose propensity to dress in women's clothing became known during a suicide attempt [in 1910]. His parents were made aware of this peculiar condition by the author and then allowed him to go onto the Variété, where he has since then performed with great success as a snake dancer.Pape became a famous cabaret artist and variety-show dancer, usually performing under the name "Voo-Doo" or "Voo Doo" while wearing orientalized versions of female belly-dancing attire in acts such as "Opium Death" and "Elagabalus." In 1927, the German lesbian magazine Die Freundin published photographs of Pape captioned: "The Transvestite Voo-Doo, One of the Most Prominent International Dance-stars." Pape performed in Berlin, Zürich, Paris, Vienna, and other major European cities between 1917 and 1928.

Pape eventually owned a club, named "Voo-Doo." In the llustrated Guide to 'Depraved' Berlin (1931), Curt Moreck (a pseudonym of German author ) described the club "Voo-Doo" as a good nightlife spot for "befriended couples" looking for an "exotic night." Klaus Mann and Christopher Isherwood visited Pape's clubs. After retiring from vaudeville in 1927, Willli Pape, with a boyfriend, opened also a bar named "The Petite Lion". It was located on Skalitzer St. 7 and advertised as a "Meeting Place for Transvestites".

Pape might also have been an artist, as drawings by "Voo-Doo," "a Lady dancer" survive.

As a child, Pape preferred female clothing and wanted to work in a circus or on stage. Pape presented as female and signed into several hotels as Selma Bruegge, but after Pape's suicide attempt in 1910, this name was not used again. When summoned for military service in 1914, Pape presented in female clothing. According to Hirschfeld, who used masculine pronouns for Pape, Pape did not find men attractive at the time of their first encounter; Pape had been engaged to a woman and later had a male lover. German scholar Jens Dobler, who has uncovered much of Pape's biography, writes of "Willi Pape, alias Voo-Doo," as a homosexual "drag artist" (in German: Travestiekünstler) who was referred to by others as "he" and "she;" he also discusses how Pape's life challenged gender norms and that even the terms he has applied are fraught. No known documents survive that describe Pape's gender or sexual identification in Pape's own words.

References

External links 
 Photograph of "Voo-Doo Performing," .
 Photograph of "Voo-Doo Laying Down," , partially nude.

Transgender artists
German dancers
LGBT cabaret performers
1893 births
1967 deaths
Cross-dressers
Male-to-female cross-dressers
German drag queens
Transgender drag performers
20th-century German LGBT people